Sonic Unyon Recording Company is an independent record label based in Hamilton, Ontario, Canada.  Their former retail store was located on Wilson Street near James Street North.  The label has put out releases by bands including Tristan Psionic, Sianspheric, Shallow North Dakota, Eric's Trip, Hayden, Chore, Frank Black and the Catholics, A Northern Chorus, Raising the Fawn, Teenage Head and Voivod.

History

Sonic Unyon was founded in 1993 by Mark Milne, Sandy McIntosh of the band Tristan Psionic. At first they released their own band's music, and then began releasing and promoting music by other local bands. By 1995 Sonic Unyon had grown to be one of the largest independent labels in Canada. The basement of their headquarter often held shows and many local musicians got jobs working for the record label.

As of 2005, Sonic Unyon releases were distributed in the United States exclusively by Caroline Distribution.

Tim Potocic and Mark Milne created Sonic Unyon Distribution as a branch of the record label, and distributed releases in Canada from independent labels from around the world and select co-releases with other independent labels including Jagjaguwar, Nuclear Blast, WARP, Fearless and Plexifilm (including the Death Cab for Cutie tour DVD, Drive Well, Sleep Carefully).

Sonic Unyon branched out into events production, by organizing Supercrawl, the annual version of the monthly Artcrawl, which is dedicated to showcasing the arts scene in the James North region of Hamilton. The event has featured many national and international touring artists; in 2014, its attendance was estimated at 165,000.

Selected artists
The following artists have made at least one release through Sonic Unyon.

See also

Now We Are 5 (1998), Sonic Unyon's fifth anniversary compilation album
List of record labels

References

External links
 Sonic Unyon
1995 Sonic Unyon TV Interview

Record labels established in 1993
Canadian independent record labels
Indie rock record labels
Alternative rock record labels
Companies based in Hamilton, Ontario
Music of Hamilton, Ontario